Bailya sanctorum is a species of sea snail, a marine gastropod mollusc in the family Pisaniidae,.

Description

Distribution

References

External links

Pisaniidae
Gastropods described in 2009